Victor Alekseyevich Vaziulin  (20 August 1932 – 8 January 2012) was a Soviet Russian philosopher. He became famous for his deep knowledge of Karl Marx's work as well as for further developing Marxism through the dialectical sublation of its acquis.

Doctor of Sciences in Philosophical Sciences (1973).

Biography 
V. A. Vaziulin was born in Zvenigorod, Moscow Oblast on 30 August 1932 and studied philosophy at Lomonosov University (1950–55), defended his PhD thesis at 1964 and his postdoctoral thesis at 1971. At 1964 he became professor at Lomonosov University, where he taught until his retirement. He also taught at the universities of Bratislava and Prague. He died in Moscow on 8 January 2012.

Work 
V. A. Vaziulin wrote a novel, distinct direction in social theory, dialectical logic and science methodology. The main scientific achievements of V. A. Vaziulin include:

 Revealed the logic of Karl Marx's "Capital: Critique of Political Economy" theory by a systematic, categorical, comparative evaluation of the "Capital's" politico-economic material alongside a parallel, critical analysis of Hegel’s "The Science of Logic". This comparative cross-examination enabled him to explore the methodology of the advanced scientific research, of the mature science as an organic whole. Within the framework of this logic and methodology are revealed- in "pure form"- i) the ascent from the abstract to the concrete  in its dialectical unity with the ascent from the sensual-concrete to the abstract, ii) the logical in its unity with the historical and, iii) the reasonable aspect of thinking (germ. Vernunft) in unity with the intellectual (germ. Verstand).     

 A concrete-historical approach of Marxism as a scientific system that is developed through the emergence and resolution of necessary contradictions. For Vaziulin, Marxism is a scientific system that consists of internally united- in their differences- components, each of which is at a certain level of its formation and development. This logical and methodological analysis of the history of Marxism  paved the way for i) the discovery of the objective laws and contradictions  (including the necessary fallacies) of the beginning, the emergence, the formation, and the maturity of the development of scientific research, i.e. the movement of cognitive thinking from the surface to the essence of the object (of the subject matter) and, ii) the development of the most promising components of Marxism.

 Revealed the inner, systematic interconnection of laws and categories of social theory which reflect the structure of the mature society and outlined the theoretical periodization of human history (the objective laws of its "ascent" from the beginning, the emergence, the formation, to the maturity) from the perspective of the interactions of natural and social factors.

The first two achievements are internally connected to the approach of scientific thinking as a natural-historical process.

Bibliography
In Russian:
 Логика «Капитала» К.Маркса, Москва 1968, 2002.
 Становление метода научного исследования К.Маркса (логический аспект), Москва 1975, 2017
 Диалектика исторического процесса и методология его исследования, Москва 1978, 2007
 Логика истории. Вопросы теории и методологии, Москва 1988, 2005, 2016.

In German:
 W.A. Wasjulin: Das Historische und das Logische in der Methodologie von Karl Marx, in: Internationale Marx-Engels-Foruschung (Marxistische Studien. Jahrbuch des IMSF 12), Frankfurt/M 1987, S. 238–244
 V.A. Vazjulin: Nach dem Sieg der Konterrevolution – den welthistorischen Übergang zum Kommunismus denken. Gespräch in Moskau, 1992 geführt von Gudrun Havemann, Wladimir Koschel und Manolis Dafermakis in Moskau, veröff. in Zeitschrift Marxistische Erneuerung – Z. – Nr. 14, Juni 1993
 V.A.Vazjulin: Das System der Logik G.W.F.Hegels und das System der Logik des «Kapitals» von Karl Marx»
 V.A. Vazjulin: Entwicklung systematisch denken, in: Deutsche Zeitschrift für Philosophie 2005/2, S. 203–218
 V.A. Vazjulin: Die Logik des «Kapitals» von Karl Marx, Books on Demand GmbH, Norderstedt 2006
 V.A. Vazjulin: Die Logik der Geschichte, Books on Demand GmbH, Norderstedt 2011

In Greek:
 Η διαλεκτική του ιστορικού προτσές και η μεθοδολογία της έρευνάς του. «Σύγχρονη εποχή», Αθ. 1988.
 Η λογική της ιστορίας. Εισαγωγή-Μετάφρ.-Σχόλια Δημήτρης Πατέλης. «Ελληνικά γράμματα», Αθ. 2004, 2η έκδ. ΚΨΜ, Αθ. 2013.

References

 Moscow State University web-page
 Short biography (in Russian)
 Marx's Global Reception Today- Marx in Russia
 The Logic of Capital: Some recent analyses
 Recent Soviet works on the scientific method of Marx's Capital and related topics
 Marx in Russia
 Marx worldwide : on the development of the international discourse on Marx since 1965
 M. Dafermos (2021). Rethinking the relationship between Marx’s Capital and Hegel’s Science of Logic: The tradition of creative Soviet Marxism. Capital & Class.https://journals.sagepub.com/eprint/A6JFYYWI5KKP72TVVYAC/full

External links
  Official webpage of V. A. Vaziulin and of the International School of "Logic of History"

1932 births
2012 deaths
20th-century Russian philosophers
21st-century Russian philosophers
Materialists
Marxist theorists
Russian communists
Russian Marxists
Soviet philosophers
Academic staff of Moscow State University
Moscow State University alumni
Soviet professors